Bas Ek Pal is a 2006 Bollywood romantic crime thriller film directed by Onir. It stars Juhi Chawla, Sanjay Suri, and Urmila Matondkar with Jimmy Sheirgill, Rehaan Engineer, and Yashpal Sharma in supporting roles. The film's storyline is an adaptation of Live Flesh, a film by Pedro Almodóvar.

Plot
Nikhil Kapoor decides to return from the US to Mumbai. When he arrives, he decides to chill out at a nightclub. There he meets a woman and instantly falls for her; she, however, doesn't even introduce herself. After he asks her name, she goes away. The next day, Nikhil meets his old friend Rahul. The two play basketball and hang out together. Whilst in the company of Rahul and Steve (Rehaan Engineer), another one of Nikhil's friends; the woman shows up again and she is revealed to be Anamika Joshi. She walks in with her friend Farhad, and when Nikhil tries to talk to Anamika, Farhad begins to think he is flirting with or disturbing her, and a fight breaks out.

Naturally, Rahul and Steve join in as well. Farhad draws a gun impulsively and Nikhil snatches it from him, pointing it towards him. In the ensuing scuffle, while Steve tries to stop Nikhil by holding him from behind and Rahul tries to draw Farhad away, a bullet is accidentally shot by Nikhil; hitting Rahul in the back. Steve runs away in panic. Anamika also disappears. Farhad flees the country and quietly leaves for Australia. The police arrive at the scene and arrest Nikhil. Rahul gets paralysed and loses the use of his legs. When Nikhil is kept in a cell by the police for shooting at Rahul, he tells them to ask Rahul himself, who refuses to speak with him. Also, Nikhil has no way of contacting Anamika to prove his innocence. Three years after having been imprisoned, Ira Malhotra hears his side of the story and helps bail him out. Now Nikhil gets to meet Rahul and Anamika and eventually finds out that he was lured into a trap by someone, who is still at large. Eventually, it turns out that Ira and Rahul were having an affair, and Steve learned of it. In order to teach Rahul a lesson, that night at the party, he pressed the trigger while he was trying to stop Nikhil, with the gun in Nikhil's hand, making it look like Nikhil had done all this. Ira knew this all along, and that's why she helped Nikhil to get bailed out. She tries to leave Steve and comes to Nikhil, where an angry Steve confronts both of them and threatens them with a gun. Steve shoots Nikhil in the stomach, fatally wounding him. Ira holds herself responsible for whatever wrong has happened to Nikhil and shoots herself leaving Steve shocked and repenting. Steve commits suicide by shooting a bullet in his head and dies instantly.

Anamika and Rahul, fearing the worst, reach Nikhil's house, where a dying Nikhil finally succumbs in Anamika's lap. The movie ends with both Anamika and Rahul standing together, looking towards the sunset in silence.

Cast
 Juhi Chawla as Ira Malhotra
 Urmila Matondkar as Anamika Joshi
 Jimmy Sheirgill as Rahul Kher
 Sanjay Suri as Nikhil Kapoor
 Rehaan Engineer as Steve O'Brien
 Yashpal Sharma as Swamy
 Chetan Pandit as Chandu Bhai
 Krishnakumar Kunnath as himself (cameo)
 Sunidhi Chauhan as herself (cameo)

Music

The Bas Ek Pal album contains nine songs, three of them are remixes. The soundtrack is notable for its Western flavor being generally praised by critics. The music directors are Vivek Phillip, Mithoon and Pritam with lyrics written by Amitabh Varma and Sayeed Quadri. Pritam copies Yuri Mrakadi's "Arabiyon Ana" already lifted by him in Ek Khiladi Ek Haseena to create the song "Hai Ishq." The song "Tere Bin" which was composed by Mithoon was voted as one of the best songs of 2006. The soundtrack was released on two-channel compact disc and cassette tape and received good reviews from critics.

References

External links
 

2006 films
2000s Hindi-language films
Films featuring songs by Pritam
Films scored by Mithoon
Indian remakes of Spanish films
2006 crime thriller films
2000s romantic thriller films
Films set in the United States
Romantic crime films